John Harold Sharp MC (1885–1965) was a Scottish professional football forward who played in the Scottish League for Hibernian and St Bernard's.

Personal life 
After the outbreak of the First World War in 1914, Sharp enlisted in the Argyll and Sutherland Highlanders. By mid-1918 he was serving as a temporary lieutenant and performed a deed which saw him awarded with the Military Cross on 16 September 1918:

Career statistics

References

Date of birth missing
Scottish footballers
Scottish Football League players
British Army personnel of World War I
Argyll and Sutherland Highlanders officers
1885 births
1965 births
Association football forwards
Recipients of the Military Cross
Hibernian F.C. players
St Bernard's F.C. players
Date of death missing
Footballers from Edinburgh